Rensing is a surname. Notable people with the surname include:

 Damon Rensing, American soccer coach
 Gary Rensing (born 1947), American soccer player
 Michael Rensing (born 1984), German football player